Artful Kate is a one reel silent film produced  and released by IMP, the Independent Moving Pictures Company. It was directed Thomas H. Ince and starred Mary Pickford and her husband Owen Moore, previously working for D.W. Griffith at Biograph.

This film is preserved in the Library of Congress collection.

Cast
Mary Pickford - Artful Kate Stanley
Owen Moore - Lt. Hamilton
Charles Arling -

References

External links 

 Artful Kate at IDDb.com
 

1911 films
Films directed by Thomas H. Ince
American silent short films
American black-and-white films
Independent Moving Pictures films
Films produced by Carl Laemmle
Surviving American silent films
Films shot in Fort Lee, New Jersey
1910s American films